The following is a Mackerras pendulum for the 2012 Queensland state election.

"Very safe" seats require a swing of more than 20 points to change, "safe" seats10–20 points to change, "fairly safe" seats 6–10 points, and "marginal" seats less than 6 points.

Pendulums for Queensland state elections